Per Göran Svante Grundberg, (9 November 1943 – 25 April 2019) was a Swedish actor, author, director and stand-up comedian. Grundberg worked as an actor and director at many theaters like Teater 9 and Radioteatern in Stockholm, he made his movie debut in Marianne Ahrne's movie "Frihetens murar" in 1978, and had after that participated in two more of her productions, the TV-series "Den tredje lyckan" in 1983 and the movie "På liv och död" in 1986. He is also known for his role as Mr. Storch in Sällskapsresan in 1980. He acted in all three of the Göta Kanal movies. In 2000, he published the book Nattsuddboken.

Filmography

Film

1978: Frihetens murar - Waiter
1980: Sällskapsresan - Arne Storch
1980: Mördare! Mördare! (TV Movie) - Andréasson
1980: Mannen som gick upp i rök - Policeman
1981: Dagar i Gdansk (TV Movie) - Bogdan Lis
1981: Göta kanal eller Vem drog ur proppen? - Kanotisten
1982: Gräsänklingar - Staffan
1983: Den tredje lyckan (TV Mini-Series) - Hardware Clerk
1983: Henrietta - Gotthard
1984: Julstrul med Staffan & Bengt (TV Series) - Klas
1986: På liv och död - Leif
1988: Enkel resa - Sune
1988: Guld! (TV Mini-Series) - Nyberg
1990: Smash (TV Mini-Series) - Einar Berg
1991: Ett paradis utan biljard - Policeman
1992: Rederiet (TV Series) - Stig
1995: Sommarens Goda (TV-serie)
1997: Adam & Eva - Svante Grundberg (uncredited)
2000: Ronny & Julia (TV Series) - Elektronika
2003: Lillebror på tjuvjakt - Vakt
2003: Hagström - allt i musik2006: Göta kanal 2 – kanalkampen - Kanotisten
2009: Slitage (Short) - Staffan
2009: Göta kanal 3 – Kanalkungens hemlighet - Kanotisten
2010: Den ryska dörren (TV Movie) - Communal chairman
2012: Flimmer - Styrelsemedlem
2017: Småstaden (TV Series) - Tråkbosse (final appearance)

Director
1982: Gluggen (TB)
1985–1991: Nattsudd (TV-serie)
1987: Bo Diddley: I Don't Sound Like Nobody (TV)
1989: The Crickets: My Love Is Bigger Than a Cadillac (TV)
1990: Rökrock - The Non-History of Rock'n Roll
1994: Goodnight Sweden (TV)
2005: Swingen anfaller (TV)

Bibliography
2000 -Nattsuddboken

References

1943 births
2019 deaths
Swedish male film actors
Swedish male stage actors
Swedish male writers
Swedish male comedians
Swedish television directors
Swedish stand-up comedians
20th-century Swedish comedians
21st-century Swedish comedians
20th-century Swedish male actors
21st-century Swedish male actors
People from Sundsvall Municipality